Ali Mema (1 February 1943 – 26 March 2019) was an Albanian professional footballer who played as a midfielder. He played for 17 Nëntori Tirana for the majority of his career as well as the Albania national team, whom he earned 14 senior caps with.

He has been regarded as one of Tirana's greatest players in history.

Club career
Mema was born in Tiranë and grew up on Shyqyri Bërxolli Road, which is in the centre of the capital, where he lived with his family that included his brothers Haxhi and Osman, who would both also become professional footballers. He attended the Kostandin Kristoforidhi School near his home, where he represented the school's football team before joining his local team 17 Nëntori Tirana which was near to his family. He initially joined the 17 Nëntori Tirana youth team before being promoted to the senior team in 1960 at the age of just 17. He was told by his youth team coach Xhavit Demneri after training to report to the senior side the following day as he had been called up by first team coach Myslym Alla for the derby against Partizani Tirana. Mema featured in the game as a substitute for legendary striker Refik Resmja with ten minutes remaining, and although his side lost the coach Alla was still highly impressed with Mema and he was promoted to the first team on a permanent basis from that moment on.

Mema was famous especially for his performance as a goalkeeper in the 1962–63 Albanian Cup final against Besa Kavajë. Tirana lost the first leg 3–2 at home but won the second 1–0. The away goals rule wasn't valid at that time in Albanian football, so the match had to be decided by penalty shootouts. Both Tirana's goalkeepers (Metani and Beliu) were injured, so the players suggested coach Myslym Alla to place Mema as a goalkeeper, due to Mema's experience in the past in this role. He saved the first three penalties executed by T'habit Rexha, paving Tirana's path to victory after Pavllo Bukoviku scored the first three for Mema's side.

Mema retired from football in 1972 aged just 29 after the club decided that the renovation of the team was needed, meaning that there would be no place for the established and mature players like him.

International career
He made his debut for Albania in a June 1963 Olympic Games qualification match against Bulgaria in Tirana and earned a total of 14 caps, scoring no goals. His final international was a December 1967 European Championship qualification match against West Germany.

International statistics
Source:

Style of play
Mema was hailed as one of Albania's greatest players in the 1960s and 1970s. Despite standing at only 5 ft 8 in, Mema was an areal threat and is known to have scored at least a heading goal against every opponent he has faced. He played most of his career as a midfielder, where he excelled with his technique, ball control, vision, and was also a player who could use either foot. He had also been praised by his peers for the determination, discipline and fairplay he displayed on the pitch.

Personal life
Ali was part of Mema dynasty, a family which has produced several footballers throughout the years. His brothers Haxhi and Osman were both footballers, as well as his nephew and Haxhi's son Sulejman. He had two sons, including Ardian Mema, who was also a footballer who played mostly for Tirana and is currently its coach.

Honours
Albanian Superliga: 4
 1965, 1966, 1968, 1970

References

External links

1943 births
2019 deaths
Footballers from Tirana
Albanian footballers
Albania international footballers
Association football midfielders
KF Tirana players
KF Vllaznia Shkodër players
FK Partizani Tirana players
Kategoria Superiore players
Albanian football managers
KF Tirana managers
Kategoria Superiore managers